New Walk is a promenade in the city of Leicester, which connects the areas around Victoria Park (including Stoneygate, Evington and Clarendon Park) to the city centre. The promenade is a rare surviving example of a Georgian promenade. The walk is just under a mile long. A number of buildings sit along New Walk, including office buildings for the Leicester Mercury, Leicester Museum & Art Gallery and Holy Cross Priory.

History 
The Corporation of Leicester laid out the route in 1785. It is believed that an ancient Roman track-way called the Via Devana pre-dated the promenade and that this track-way formed the basis for the route. The original plan of the route was to connect the area which is now Welford Road to the then racecourse - which was later developed into Victoria Park. Open its foundation, it was named Queen's Walk in honor of Queen Charlotte. The new name was adopted later at an unknown date.

Houses were built alongside New Walk for the first time in the 1820s. The houses were built at a distance, set by the Corporation, of 'no less than 10 yards' from the path.

The promenade was solely for the use of pedestrians - no carriages were allowed to use New Walk. The route still remains pedestrianized and is not open to vehicles of any kind. A number of controversies regarding the use of the promenade by cyclists have arisen in recent years.

References

External links 
 
 

History of Leicester